Foni Jarrol is one of the nine districts of the Gambia's Western Division, which is located to the south of the Gambia River in the southwest of the country. Foni Jarrol is in the far east of the division, between Foni Bondali and the border with Senegal.

References 

West Coast Division (The Gambia)
Districts of the Gambia